Jillian Noel Hennessy (born November 25, 1968) is a Canadian actress and singer. She is most known for her roles on the American television series Law & Order, on which she played prosecutor Claire Kincaid for three seasons, and Crossing Jordan, on which she played the lead character, Jordan Cavanaugh, for six seasons. She has also acted in films such as RoboCop 3 and Most Wanted, and the independent films Chutney Popcorn and The Acting Class, the latter of which she also wrote and co-directed.

Early life
Hennessy was born in Edmonton, Alberta. Her father, John Hennessy, was a meat salesman and sales/marketing executive, a job that required considerable travel and resulted in frequent moves for the family. Her mother, Maxine, a secretary, left the family in 1982, leaving her daughter to be partially raised by her paternal grandmother, Eleanor, in Kitchener, Ontario. She has a younger brother, John Paul "J.P." Hennessy, Jr., and an identical twin sister, Jacqueline, who is a magazine writer and TV show host in Canada. Hennessy has Irish, French, Swedish and Italian ancestry on her father's side, and mostly Ukrainian Roma, as well as Austrian, ancestry on her mother's. She attended Stanley Park Senior Public School and graduated from Grand River Collegiate Institute, both in Kitchener, Ontario, and used to busk in the Toronto subway.

Career

Hennessy and her sister made their acting debut playing twin call girls in 1988's Dead Ringers. She was short listed for the role of Dana Scully on The X-Files according to Gillian Anderson, the actress who eventually got the role.

She appeared on Broadway in the musical Buddy – The Buddy Holly Story in 1990.

In 1993, she appeared as Dr. Marie Lazarus in RoboCop 3.

Hennesey's big network breakthrough came in 1993, when Dick Wolf signed Hennessy as assistant district attorney Claire Kincaid in the hit NBC crime drama Law & Order. She played the role for three seasons, leaving the show in 1996.

In 1999, she appeared as Lisa in Chutney Popcorn. In 2000, Hennessy wrote, produced, and jointly directed (with Elizabeth Holder) an independent film mockumentary titled The Acting Class, which looked at the trials and tribulations of a dysfunctional acting class. The film co-starred her identical twin sister Jacqueline, and included cameo appearances from a number of Hennessy's former Law & Order co-stars. She also starred in the film Nuremberg, as Elsie Douglas.

In 2001, she portrayed Jackie Kennedy in the film Jackie, Ethel, Joan: The Women of Camelot. That same year she appeared in a small role as Commander Annette Mulcahy in the Steven Seagal action film Exit Wounds, a car crash victim similar than the one in Law & Order. She received particular praise from critic Owen Gleiberman who said "With the right role, Hennessy might just be a movie star." In 2003, she made a cameo appearance in the film Abby Singer. From 2001 to 2007, she starred on the TV show Crossing Jordan as title character Jordan Cavanaugh. She also played the wife of Tim Allen's character in the 2007 film Wild Hogs. On June 9, 2007, she received a star on Canada's Walk of Fame.

During sessions in Austin, Texas, Hennessy recorded the album Ghost in My Head, which was released in June 2009. She performed as a guest of the Indigo Girls on a November 2009 show of Mountain Stage and was the focus of a show for herself later that same month. She performed on the Village Stage of the 2010 edition of Lilith Fair.

Hennessy starred in the independent crime thriller Small Town Murder Songs in 2010. She also appeared as a veterinarian in the HBO series Luck, while serving as an endorser of Zaxby's "Zalads" in a pair of television commercials during 2012.

In 2015, Hennessy appeared in several episodes of Madam Secretary. In October of that year, her second album, I Do, was released.

In 2018, she appeared on the Michael Weatherly series Bull as the mother of the deceased hacker character Cable McCrory. Also in 2018, she began the role of Senator Huntington on the series Yellowstone.

Personal life
Hennessy is multilingual, speaking English, Italian, French, Spanish and German. Hennessy plays the guitar and sings, and enjoys riding motorcycles with her husband, Paolo Mastropietro, whom she married in 2000. They had a second marriage ceremony in January 2001, which took place at New York City Hall with Mayor Rudy Giuliani officiating. Their son Marco was born in 2003, and a second son, Gianni, was born in 2007.

In popular culture
The Minneapolis-based band Mollycuddle wrote the song "The Ballad of Jill Hennessy" in honor of the actress. Hennessy was reportedly very pleased and offered to perform with the band on rhythm guitar.

Filmography

References

External links

 
 Jill Hennessy on YouTube
 
 

1968 births
Actresses from Edmonton
Canadian buskers
Canadian film actresses
20th-century Canadian actresses
Canadian people of Austrian descent
Canadian people of Irish descent
Canadian people of Italian descent
Canadian people of Swedish descent
Canadian people of Ukrainian descent
Canadian singer-songwriters
Canadian television actresses
Canadian women film directors
Film directors from Edmonton
Identical twin actresses
Living people
Musicians from Edmonton
Canadian twins
21st-century Canadian women singers